The Barum Czech Rally Zlín (also called Barum Rallye and Barum Rally Zlín), is a tarmac rally held in Zlín, Czech Republic. It is currently part of the European Rally Championship and previously has been part of the Intercontinental Rally Challenge.

Founded in 1971, it has been a round of the Czechoslovakia Rally Championship in its earliest days. It would later become a round of the Mitropa Cup, the Alpe Adria Rally Cup and since 1984, the European Rally Championship. The Austrian Rally Championship would later take in the event. The division of Czechoslovakia in 1992 saw the domestic series rebrands as the Czech-Slovak Rally Championship before finally splitting into separate championships as the Czech Republic Rally Championship and the Slovakian Rally Championship in 1994. At the same time the rally became part of the new Central European Zone Rally Championship and, like the Slovakian series would intermittently include the rally in their championship. It became part of the short-lived Intercontinental Rally Challenge.

The rally is held in the forests to the east of Zlin towards the Slovakian border. In recent years the rally has become dominated by Jan Kopecký who has won his home event ten times.

Previous winners

Multiple winners of the Barum Rally Zlín

References

External links
Official web site
Barum Rally Zlín at ewrc-results.com
Barum Rally Zlín at rallybase.com

Rally competitions in the Czech Republic
Intercontinental Rally Challenge rallies
Motorsport competitions in Czechoslovakia
European Rally Championship rallies
 
1971 establishments in Czechoslovakia
Recurring sporting events established in 1971